Pseudopostega texana is a moth of the family Opostegidae. It was described by Donald R. Davis and Jonas R. Stonis, 2007. It is known from the Rio Grande Valley of southern Texas, probably south into Mexico.

The length of the forewings is 2.5–3 mm. Adults have been recorded in April and from July to early October.

Etymology
The species name is derived from the general type locality, Texas.

References

Opostegidae
Moths described in 2007